Russula virescens is a basidiomycete mushroom of the genus Russula, and is commonly known as the green-cracking russula, the quilted green russula, or the green brittlegill. Considered to be one of the best edible mushrooms of the genus Russula, it is especially popular in Spain and China. With a taste that is described variously as mild, nutty, fruity, or sweet, it is cooked by grilling, frying, sautéeing, or eaten raw. Mushrooms are rich in carbohydrates and proteins, with a low fat content.

The species was described as new to science in 1774 by Jacob Christian Schaeffer. Its distribution encompasses Asia, North Africa, Europe, and Central America. Its presence in North America has not been clarified, due to confusion with the similar species Russula parvovirescens and R. crustosa. R. virescens fruits singly or scattered on the ground in both deciduous and mixed forests, forming mycorrhizal associations with broadleaf trees such as oak, European beech, and aspen. In Asia, it associates with several species of tropical lowland rainforest trees of the family Dipterocarpaceae. R. virescens has a ribonuclease enzyme with a biochemistry unique among edible mushrooms. It also has biologically active polysaccharides, and a laccase enzyme that can break down several dyes used in the laboratory and in the textile industry.

Taxonomy 

Russula virescens was first described by German polymath Jacob Christian Schaeffer in 1774 as Agaricus virescens. The species was subsequently transferred to the genus Russula by Elias Fries in 1836. According to the nomenclatural authority MycoBank, Russula furcata var. aeruginosa (published by Christian Hendrik Persoon in 1796) and Agaricus caseosus (published by Karl Friedrich Wilhelm Wallroth in 1883) are synonyms of Russula virescens. The variety albidocitrina, defined by Claude Casimir Gillet in 1876, is no longer considered to have independent taxonomic significance. According to Rolf Singer's 1986 classification of Russula, R. virescens is the type species of subsection Virescentinae in section Rigidae, a grouping of mushrooms characterized by a cap surface that breaks into patches of bran-like (furfuraceous) particles. In a molecular phylogenetic analysis of European Russula, R. virescens formed a clade with R. mustelina; these two species were sister to a clade containing R. amoenicolor and R. violeipes.

The specific epithet virescens is Latin for "becoming green". The characteristic pattern of the cap surface has earned the species common names such as the green-cracking russula, the quilted green russula, and the green brittlegill. In the mid-Atlantic United States, it is also known locally as the moldy russula.

Description 

The cap center is often depressed. The cuticle of the cap is green, most profoundly in the center, with patches of the same color dispersed radially around the center in an areolate pattern. The color of the cuticle is often of variable shade, ranging from gray to verdigris to grass-green. The extent of the patching of the cuticle is also variable, giving specimens with limited patches a resemblance to other green-capped species of Russula, such as R. aeruginea. The green patches of the cap lie on a white to pale green background. The cap, while frequently round, may also exhibit irregular lobes and cracks. The cap cuticle is thin, and can be readily peeled off the surface to a distance of about halfway towards the cap center.
The gills are white to cream colored, and fairly crowded together; they are mostly free from attachment to the stipe. Gills are interconnected at their bases by veins. The top portion of the stipe may be farinose—covered with a white, mealy powder. It may turn slightly brown with age, or when it is injured or bruised from handling. Like other mushrooms in the Russulales, the flesh is brittle, owing to the sphaerocyst cytoarchitecture—cylindrical cells that contrast with the typical fibrous, filamentous hyphae present in other orders of the basidiomycota.

The spores of R. virescens are elliptical or ellipsoid with warts, translucent (hyaline), and produce a white, pale or pale yellow spore print; the spore dimensions are 6–9 by 5–7 µm. A partial reticulum (net-like pattern of ridges) interconnects the warts. The spore-bearing cells, the basidia, are club-shaped and have dimensions of 24–33 by 6–7.5 µm; they are colorless, and each hold from two to four spores. The pleurocystidia (cystidia on the gill face) are 40–85 by 6–8 µm and end abruptly in a sharp point.

Similar species 
Compared to R. virescens, it tends to be more bluish-green, the patches on its cap are larger, and it has a lined cap margin. Microscopically, the terminal cells in the cap cuticle of R. parvovirescens are more swollen than those of R. virescens, which has tapered and elongated terminal cells. Another green-capped Russula is R. aeruginea, but this species may be distinguished from R. virescens by its smaller size and smooth cap. Other green russulas with a smooth cap include R. heterophylla and R. cyanoxantha var. peltereaui. Russula crustosa, like R. virescens, also has an areolate cap, but the cap becomes sticky (viscid) when moist, and its color is more variable, as it may be reddish, yellowish, or brown. Also, the spore print of R. crustosa is a darker yellow than R. virescens. R. redolens has a cap that is "drab-green to blue-green", but unlike R. virescens, is smooth. R. redolens has an unpleasant taste and smells of parsley.

Edibility 

Russula virescens is an edible mushroom considered to be one of the best of the genus Russula, and is popular in Europe, particularly in Spain. In an 1875 work on the uses of fungi, English mycologist Mordecai Cubitt Cooke remarked about the mushroom that "the peasants about Milan are in the habit of putting [it] over wood embers to toast, and eating [it] afterwards with a little salt." The mushroom is often sold as a dried product in Asia; in China, it can be found in roadside markets, and used in traditional herbal medicines.  Its smell is not distinctive, but its taste has been described as mild, nutty, fruity, or even sweet. Old specimens may smell of herrings. Drying the mushrooms enhances the nutty flavor. Mushrooms can be sautéed (the green color disappears with cooking), and young specimens that are prepared this way have a potato taste that pairs well with shallots. They are also fried or grilled, or used raw in salads.  Young specimens are pale and can be hard to identify, but the characteristic pattern of older fruit bodies makes them hard to confuse with other species. When collecting R. virescens for consumption, caution is of vital importance to avoid confusion with the dangerously poisonous Amanita phalloides (better known as the death cap), a mushroom that can be most easily identified by its volva and ring.

The nutritional components of R. virescens mushrooms have been characterized. Fresh mushrooms contain about 92.5% moisture. A  sample of dried mushroom (100 g dw) has 365 kcal (1527 kilojoules). Carbohydrates make up the bulk of the fruit bodies, comprising 62% of the dry weight; 11.1% of the carbohydrates are sugars, the large majority of which (10.9%) is mannitol. The total lipid, or crude fat, content makes up 1.85% of the dry matter of the mushroom. The proportion of fatty acids (expressed as a percentage of total fatty acids) are 28.78% saturated, 41.51% monounsaturated, and 29.71% polyunsaturated. The most prevalent fatty acids include: palmitic acid, 17.3% of total fatty acids; stearic acid, 7.16%; oleic acid, 40.27%; and linoleic acid, 29.18%. Several bioactive compounds are present in the mushroom. One hundred grams (dry weight) contains 49.3 micrograms (µg) of tocopherols (20.0 µg alpha, 21.3 µg beta, and 8.0 µg gamma) and 0.19 milligrams (mg) of the carotenoid pigment lycopene. There are 4.46 g of organic acids per 100 g of dry mushrooms, including oxalic acid (0.78 g), malic acid (2.71 g), citric acid (0.55 g), and fumaric acid (0.23 g). Mushrooms have 22.6 mg/100 g dw of the phenolic compound 4-hydroxybenzoic acid, and 15.8 mg/100 g dw of cinnamic acid.

Habitat and distribution 

Russula virescens can be found fruiting on soil in both deciduous forests and mixed forests, forming ectomycorrhizal symbiotic relationships with a variety of trees, including oaks (Quercus), European beech (Fagus sylvatica), and aspen (Populus tremula). Preliminary investigations suggest that the fungus also associates with at least ten species of Dipterocarpaceae, an important tree family prevalent in the tropical lowland forests of Southeast Asia. Fruit bodies may appear singly or in groups, reappear in the same spots year after year, and are not common. In Europe, fruiting occurs mainly during the months of summer to early autumn. A Mexican study of the seasonal occurrence of several common mushroom species in subtropical forests in Xalapa showed that the fruiting period of R. virescens occurred in April, before the onset of the rainy season.

The distribution of R. virescens in North America is subject to debate, where a number of similar species such as R. parvovirescens and R. crustosa are also recognized. One author even suggests that R. virescens "is strictly a European species", citing Buyck and collaborators (2006), who say "the virescens-crustosa group is much more complex than suspected and embraces at least a dozen taxa in the eastern US". As in Europe, Russula virescens has a widespread distribution in Asia, having been recorded from India, Malaysia, Korea, the Philippines, Nepal, China, Thailand, and Vietnam. It is also found in North Africa and Central America.

Chemistry
Russula virescens has a limited capacity to bioaccumulate the micronutrients iron, copper, and zinc from the soil.  The concentration of these trace metals is slightly higher in the caps than the stipes. A  meal of fresh mushroom caps would supply 16% of the recommended daily allowance (RDA) of copper for an adult male or female (ages 19–50); 16% or 7.3% of the RDA of iron for an adult male or female, respectively; and 16–22% of the adult RDA of zinc. The mushroom is a poor bioaccumulator of the toxic heavy metals arsenic, cadmium, lead, mercury, and nickel.

Biologically active mushroom polysaccharides have been a frequent research topic in recent decades due to their possible stimulatory effect on innate and cell-mediated immune responses, antitumor activities, and other activities. Immunostimulatory activity, antioxidant activity, cholesterol-lowering, and blood sugar-lowering effects have been detected in extracts of R. virescens fruit bodies, which are attributed to polysaccharides. A water-insoluble beta-glucan, RVS3-II, has been isolated from the fruit bodies. Sulfated derivatives of this compound have antitumor activities against sarcoma tumor cell lines. RVP, a water-soluble polysaccharide present in the mushroom, is made largely of galactomannan subunits and has antioxidant activity.

Ribonucleases (or RNases) are enzymes that catalyze the hydrolysis of ribonucleic acid (RNA), and collectively they play a critical role in many biological processes. A RNase from R. virescens was shown to be biochemically unique amongst seven edible mushroom species in several ways: it has a co-specificity towards cleaving RNA at poly A and poly C, compared to the monospecific RNases of the others; it can be adsorbed on chromatography columns containing DEAE–cellulose as the adsorbent; it has a pH optimum of 4.5, lower than all other species; and, it has a "distinctly different" N-terminal amino acid sequence. The mushroom contains a unique laccase enzyme that can break down several dyes used in the laboratory and in the textile industry, such as  bromothymol blue, eriochrome black T, malachite green, and reactive brilliant blue. Laccases are being used increasingly in the textile industry as environmental biocatalysts for the treatment of dye wastewater.

See also 

 List of Russula species

References

External links

virescens
Edible fungi
Fungi described in 1774
Fungi of Africa
Fungi of Asia
Fungi of Central America
Fungi of Europe
Fungi of North America